Ilsley may refer to:

 Ilsley (name)
 Ilsley (ship), a private schooner in the War of 1812
 East Ilsley or West Ilsley, possible site of the Battle of Ashdown (a defeat of the Danes by Alfred the Great)
 Ilsley, Kentucky, an unincorporated community, United States

See also
 Illsley